Broughton is a civil parish in the Borough of Allerdale in Cumbria, England, consisting of Great Broughton and Little Broughton. According to the 2001 census it had a population of 1,727, decreasing slightly to 1,704 at the 2011 Census.

Governance
Broughton is in the parliamentary constituency of Workington, Mark Jenkinson who is a member of the Conservative Party is the Member of parliament.

For Local Government purposes it's in the Broughton St Bridget's electoral ward of Allerdale Borough Council. This ward stretches north to Bridekirk with a total population at the 2011 Census of 4,178. Broughton is part of the Dearham and Broughton Ward of Cumbria County Council.

The village also has its own parish council; Broughton Parish Council which covers Great & Little Broughton.

See also

Listed buildings in Broughton, Cumbria

References

External links
 Cumbria County History Trust: Broughton (nb: provisional research only – see Talk page)

Civil parishes in Cumbria
Allerdale